Samuel Goldenberg may refer to:

 Samuel Goldenberg (actor) (1883/1884–1945), actor in Yiddish theatre
 Samuel Löb Goldenberg (1807–1846), Austrian Hebraist and editor
 "Samuel" Goldenberg and "Schmuÿle", sixth movement of Modest Mussorgsky's 1874 piano suite Pictures at an Exhibition